My Darkest Days was a Canadian rock band based in Peterborough, Ontario, consisting of lead singer Matt Walst, bassist Brendan McMillan, drummer Doug Oliver, and keyboardist Reid Henry. They were discovered by Chad Kroeger of Nickelback, who signed them to his record label, 604 Records. They are best known for their 2010 single "Porn Star Dancing".

In June 2010 the band went on tour with Sick Puppies, Janus, and It's Alive, and shot the video for "Porn Star Dancing" in Las Vegas. In August 2010, they toured with Trapt, Skillet, and Papa Roach. Chad Kroeger appears and sings in the "Porn Star Dancing" video, as does American rapper Ludacris (in the extended version only) and Black Label Society frontman Zakk Wylde, playing lead guitar for the single. Matt Walst is currently the lead vocalist of his brother Brad's band Three Days Grace.

History

Early years 
The band was founded by Matt Walst in 2005, who was born in Norwood, Ontario, and whose older brother, Brad Walst, is the bassist for Canadian rock band, Three Days Grace. Instead of playing in his brother's band, Matt decided to form one of his own with his friends Brendan McMillan on bass guitar, Doug Oliver on drums, and Chris McMillan on lead guitar. The Chris McMillan left the band and became an electrician being replaced by Paulo Neta. In 2009, a friend introduced Walst to Toronto-based singer/guitarist Sal Costa, who later became the band's guitarist, replacing Paulo Neta, who became the guitarist for Thornley and eventually Big Wreck. However, the departure of Sal was confirmed on the website in a post dated January 9, 2013. My Darkest Days has opened for many bands, including Three Days Grace, Default, Theory of a Deadman, Skillet, Papa Roach, Nickelback, and Hinder.

My Darkest Days won a contest called Rock Search put on by 97.7 HTZ FM in St. Catharines, Ontario in 2008 with "Every Lie". This gave them time in a recording studio publicity in Niagara, Ontario. It gave the band money to tour for a year as well.

Debut album (2009–2011) 

When Chad Kroeger heard My Darkest Days' music, he was so impressed he immediately signed them to his record label. Matt Walst gave Chad Kroeger their demo while touring together. The first song they wrote after being signed was "Porn Star Dancing", which became their first single. Kroeger decided he wanted to be featured on it, along with a friend of his, Zakk Wylde, lead vocalist and lead guitarist for Black Label Society and a former guitarist for Ozzy Osbourne. Kroeger and Wylde both appear in the video, which was filmed at the Hard Rock Las Vegas Vanity nightclub. A remix of the single was also released which featured Atlanta rapper Ludacris. 
On their official Facebook page, My Darkest Days announced their debut self-titled album was to be released on September 21, 2010. On the album, the song "Set It on Fire" features Australian singer/guitarist Orianthi on lead guitar, known from her work with Steve Vai, Carlos Santana, and Michael Jackson. Also on the album is a collaboration with country-pop singer Jessie James, on the Duran Duran cover "Come Undone".

The Saw 3D soundtrack released on October 26, 2010, features the song "The World Belongs to Me".

My Darkest Days was named the "Best New Band of 2010" by hardDriveXL after hitting the No. 1 spot on Billboard's Hot Mainstream Rock Tracks ranking, as well as No. 1 on FMQB's Active Rock list.

My Darkest Days' first major-label single, "Porn Star Dancing", went gold in Canada and in the United States.

In March 2011, My Darkest Days was involved in a bus accident where their Bandwagon RV style bus flipped and fell into a ditch in rural Idaho. No major injuries were incurred, but drummer Doug Oliver suffered a sprained ankle and the band missed one tour date in Boise with Three Days Grace. It was announced on their Facebook page that they will be entering the studio in October 2011 with Joey Moi of Mountain View Records to start writing new material for their next album.

Sick and Twisted Affair (2012) 
The lead single from their second studio album, "Casual Sex", was released to iTunes on January 17, 2012, and was sent to Canadian rock radios on January 13, 2012. Their second album, Sick and Twisted Affair, was released on March 26, 2012. It features the singles, "Casual Sex" and "Sick And Twisted Affair".
My Darkest Days went on tour with Nickelback, Bush, and Seether in April 2012. They were a part of Nickelback's Here and Now 2012 World Tour. "Save Yourself", taken from Sick and Twisted Affair, was featured on the soundtrack for the hockey video game, NHL 13.

Three Days Grace and side projects (2013–present)

Following frontman Adam Gontier's departure from Three Days Grace in 2013, Matt Walst was brought on as their replacement lead vocalist for their tour, and was later made the permanent lead singer of the band.

Former guitarist Sal Costa formed and fronted the band Smashing Satellites in 2014. Since then, the band has released two EPs and a full album and standalone single as of 2016.

While Walst has been busy with Three Days Grace, MDD bandmates started up side projects of their own. In 2013, Doug Oliver started Cold Creek County, a country music group, with Brandon Scott out of Brighton, Ontario. Reid Henry & Brendan McMillan started a band called "Deadset Society" touring across the US. Their song "Like a Nightmare" reached number 2 on SXM Octane channel and US/Canadian terrestrial Active Rock stations.

In May 2019, following a split in the band, three members of Deadset Society released three singles under a new band name "Tense Machine". The lineup features Dane Hartsell on lead vocals and guitar, Brendan McMillan on bass and Mike Langford on drums and production. Their first single "Best Mistake" reached top 50 at US Active Rock Radio and has over 250,000 streams. In May 2020, the band released a full-length album titled "Echoes", with close to one million online streams.

In June 2020, Reid Henry launched a solo project with his debut single "Monster" garnering US Active Rock radio play and hundreds of thousands of streams worldwide. In December 2020, Reid launched his second solo single, "The Blind".

In spite of their extended hiatus, My Darkest Days still maintains an active Facebook page as of September 2021.

Members 

Final lineup 
 Matt Walst – lead vocals, guitar 
 Reid Henry – keyboards, backing vocals, guitar 
 Brendan McMillan – bass, backing vocals 
 Doug Oliver – drums, percussion 

 Former members
 Sal Costa – lead guitar, backing vocals 
 Chris McMillan – lead guitar, backing vocals 
 Paulo Neta – guitar, vocals

Discography

Studio albums

Singles

Awards and nominations

Notes

References 

Other sources
https://junoawards.ca/nomination/2011-new-group-of-the-year-sponsored-by-factor-and-radio-starmaker-fund-my-darkest-days/

External links 
 

Canadian hard rock musical groups
Canadian post-grunge groups
Musical groups from Peterborough, Ontario
Musical groups established in 2005
2005 establishments in Ontario
Musical quintets
Musical groups disestablished in 2013
2013 disestablishments in Ontario